Hello Brother may refer to:

Film and television
 Hello Brother (1994 film), a Telugu film starring Akkineni Nagarjuna, Soundarya and Ramya Krishna and directed by E.V.V. Satyanarayana
 Hello Brother (1999 film), a Hindi film starring Salman Khan and Rani Mukerji and directed by Sohail Khan
 Hello, Brother, a 2005 South Korean film directed by Lim Tai-kyung
 "Hello Brother", an episode from the eighth season of the television series The Vampire Diaries

Music
 "Hello Brother", a song from the soundtrack of the 2010 Australian film Legend of the Guardians: The Owls of Ga'Hoole
 "Hello Brother", a song from the soundtrack of the 2014 Tamil film Irumbu Kuthirai
 "Hello Brother', a 2019 song by Nigerian singer Omah Lay